Anton Hilberath (19 November 1898 – 21 April 1946) was First Sergeant in the German Army during World War II. He is one of at least 830 German POWs, who died and were buried in the United States. His is the only grave of a German POW at  Arlington National Cemetery.

References 

1898 births
1946 deaths
German Army soldiers of World War II
Burials at Arlington National Cemetery
People from Bad Neuenahr-Ahrweiler
German prisoners of war in World War II held by the United States
German people who died in prison custody
Prisoners who died in United States military detention